Rabor's lipinia or black slender tree skink (Lipinia rabori) is a species of skink found in the Philippines.

References

Lipinia
Reptiles described in 1956
Taxa named by Walter Creighton Brown
Taxa named by Angel Chua Alcala